Mack Ramsey was an American Negro league outfielder in the 1900s and 1910s.

Ramsey made his Negro leagues debut in 1906 with the Leland Giants, and played several seasons with the club through 1914. He also played for the Illinois Giants in 1909.

References

External links
 and Seamheads

Year of birth missing
Year of death missing
Place of birth missing
Place of death missing
Illinois Giants players
Leland Giants players
Baseball outfielders